Xylotribus is a genus of beetles in the family Cerambycidae, containing the following species:

 Xylotribus decorator (Fabricius, 1801)
 Xylotribus pinacopterus Lane, 1964

References

Anisocerini